Waunifor or Waun Ifor (Welsh: "Ifor's Meadow") is a historic estate, once the seat of the Lloyd and Bowen families, located in the small village  community of Maesycrugiau near Llandysul, Ceredigion, Wales, which is 60.2 miles (96.9 km) from Cardiff and 179.9 miles (289.5 km) from London.

Waunifor is now a Centre with 6 holiday cottages and 2 meeting rooms owned by the Template Foundation charity.  It is used for workshops, art exhibitions, wellbeing seminars, youth gatherings, bereavement counselling and music events.

Waunifor is represented in the Senedd by Elin Jones (Plaid Cymru) and is part of the Ceredigion constituency in the House of Commons.

See also
List of localities in Wales by population

References

Villages in Ceredigion
Llandysul